Čeloica Mountain, often called Dobra Voda (after its highest peak), is part of the mountain range in North Macedonia, including Osoj, Suva Gora and Pesjak mountains, that lie in a north–south orientation. Its high point, Dobra Voda, stands 2062 meters above sea level.  It is rarely visited, with no tourist facilities. Its only structures are a shelter built by the Korab mountaineering club in the village of Zelezna Reka (Iron River), and one at the monastery of St. Nicola.

Two-thousanders of North Macedonia